Jiří Koštíř (1928-19 June 1960) is a former Grand Prix motorcycle road racer from the former Czechoslovakia.

Motorcycle Grand Prix results 

(key) (Races in italics indicate fastest lap)

References 

1928 births
Czechoslovak motorcycle racers
Czech motorcycle racers
125cc World Championship riders
250cc World Championship riders
Isle of Man TT riders
1960 deaths